Triepeolus grandis is a species of cuckoo bees in the family Apidae. It is found in Central America and North America.

References

 Moure, J. S., and G. A. R. Melo / Moure, Jesus Santiago, Danúncia Urban, and Gabriel A. R. Melo, org (2007). "Nomadini Latreille, 1802". Catalogue of bees (Hymenoptera, Apoidea) in the neotropical region, 578–599.
 Rightmyer, Molly G. (2008). "A review of the cleptoparasitic bee genus Triepeolus (Hymenoptera: Apidae). Part I".

Further reading

 

Nomadinae
Insects described in 1917